The Binary Guardians are a group of hackers that have claimed responsibility for several attacks to government and private websites in Venezuela. The group is made of informatic security analysts with several years of experience.

External links 

 Official website

Internet-based activism
Hacking in the 2010s
Crisis in Venezuela